This is a list of notable people who attended, taught at, or were otherwise affiliated with the University of Chicago Laboratory Schools.

Alumni 

 Michael Hudson (born 1939), economics professor

Faculty 
 Blue Balliett, former 3rd grade teacher, author of acclaimed children's books Chasing Vermeer and The Wright 3, among others.
 Barbara T. Bowman, early childhood education expert and advocate.
 Wayne Brasler, former U-High Journalism adviser, awards annual Brasler Prize for outstanding high school journalism.
 Langston Hughes, author.
 Vivian Paley, former teacher and noted child psychologist.
 Craig Robinson, former head basketball coach, former Oregon State University head basketball coach; brother of Michelle Obama.

References 

University of Chicago Laboratory Schools
University of Chicago Laboratory Schools

University of Chicago Laboratory Schools people